Kim Sol-song (born 30 December 1974) is the daughter of North Korea's former leader Kim Jong-il and Kim Young-sook. She has been active within the propaganda department, been in charge of literary affairs, and previously led the security and schedule of her father as his secretary.

"Sol-song" literally means "snow pine", and the name was given by her grandfather, Kim Il-sung.

She was a favourite of her father. She attended the same school as her father, graduated from Kim Il-sung University's Economics Department and was assigned to the propaganda department of the Central Committee of the Workers' Party of Korea. She was in charge of literary affairs: all the signatures on works of literature coming into the department were signed by her.

According to a North Korean defector, who used to be a high-ranking official in Pyongyang, Sol-song was in charge of the security and schedule for Kim Jong-Il since the late 1990s. In this capacity, she accompanied her father during trips to North Korean Army units and local villages. During these trips, she has been observed wearing the uniform of a lieutenant colonel of the North Korean People's Army.

Sol-song was described by a North Korean defector as "intelligent" and "beautiful"; Seol-song had hair down to her waist and is 1.65 metres (5 ft 5 in) tall, which is considered tall for a woman.

According to a Korean intelligence official, Sol-song was a student in Paris, in the autumn of 2005.

See also
Women in North Korea

References 

1974 births
Living people
People from Pyongyang
21st-century North Korean women politicians
21st-century North Korean politicians
Kim dynasty (North Korea)